Jerry Howarth (born March 12, 1946) is an American Canadian former sports commentator, best known as the radio play-by-play voice of the Toronto Blue Jays from 1981 through the 2017 season.

Howarth had shared the play-by-play duties with his late longtime broadcast partner Tom Cheek from 1982 until 2005, then served as the play-by-play announcer until announcing his retirement before the start of spring training 2018 due to ongoing health concerns.

Early career
Born in York, Pennsylvania, and raised in San Francisco, California, Howarth grew up an avid sports fan. He graduated with a degree in Economics from the University of Santa Clara in 1968, then served two years as an officer in the U.S. Army. He launched his career as a sportscaster in 1974 by calling play-by-play action for AAA baseball's Tacoma Twins of the Pacific Coast League, as well as basketball and football for the University of Puget Sound in Tacoma, Washington.

In 1976, Howarth became the play-by-play voice of the Salt Lake City Gulls, also of the Pacific Coast League. Howarth was then hired as the Assistant General Manager and performed double duty as play-by-play man for the Utah Pros of the short-lived Western Basketball Association. Howarth was then hired as Group Sales Director by the NBA's Utah Jazz before joining KWMS radio in Salt Lake as the station's sports talk show host.

Toronto Blue Jays
In 1981, Howarth split his time between his radio duties in Salt Lake and his new career in Toronto where he worked part of the 1981 Blue Jays season as a commentator. In 1982, he joined Tom Cheek as full-time play-by-play partner. For the next 23 years, "Tom and Jerry" would be the radio voices of the Blue Jays. Their partnership covered the rise of the Blue Jays through the 1980s, culminating with back to back World Series Championships in 1992 and 1993.

In 2004, Tom Cheek was diagnosed with brain cancer, but continued to broadcast with Howarth. Cheek's health continued to deteriorate, eventually forcing him to discontinue his broadcasting career midway through the 2004 Toronto Blue Jays season. Howarth became the play-by-play broadcaster for Blue Jays games at this time and Warren Sawkiw filled in as analyst. Cheek died on 9 October 2005. Sawkiw continued to work alongside Howarth through the end of the 2006 Blue Jays season. In 2007, Sawkiw was replaced in the booth by former Blue Jay catcher Alan Ashby. Howarth continued to be the lead voice of the Toronto Blue Jays with Ashby serving as game analyst, until the end of the 2012 season. Howarth next worked alongside Jack Morris in 2013, then with Joe Siddall since 2014 through 2017. Host of "Blue Jays Talk" Mike Wilner also provided play-by-play for some innings, Duane Ward supplied colour commentary for some games during the 2014 and 2015 season and Kevin Barker supplied color for some games during the 2016 season.

On August 11, 2012, Howarth was awarded the Canadian Baseball Hall of Fame's Jack Graney Award.

In October 2016, prior to the American League Championship Series between Toronto and Cleveland, Howarth revealed in an interview on CJCL that in 1992, he had quietly taken a vow to not use team nicknames or expressions on-air that he considered to be offensive to aboriginal Canadians or Native Americans, such as the Atlanta Braves and Cleveland Indians. He began the practice after receiving a letter from a listener who was a member of a First Nation group, whose writer explained that the names were offensive. Howarth felt the letter was written "in such a loving, kind way" and that it had "touched [his] heart", which led him to respect their wishes. Renu Mandhane, chief commissioner of the Ontario Human Rights Commission, supported Howarth's position, and called upon other media outlets to stop using the name in the wake of Cleveland's playoff series.

On November 16, 2016, it was announced that Howarth had been diagnosed with prostate cancer, and that he would undergo surgery in the following week to remove a small tumor from his prostate. Howarth retired from broadcasting in February 2018 due to health reasons.

Personal
Howarth, who became a Canadian citizen in 1994, lives in Toronto with his wife Mary. They have two sons, Joe and Ben.

Howarth coached high school basketball for 20 years at Etobicoke Collegiate Institute. He is also known for his active support and fund raising efforts on behalf of the Special Olympics.

Works

References

1946 births
American Anglicans
American emigrants to Canada
Canadian radio sportscasters
Christians from California
College basketball announcers in the United States
College football announcers
Living people
Major League Baseball broadcasters
Minor League Baseball broadcasters
People from York, Pennsylvania
Radio personalities from San Francisco
Santa Clara University alumni
Sportspeople from Pennsylvania
Toronto Blue Jays announcers
United States Army officers
Naturalized citizens of Canada